The Agniswarar Temple (கஞ்சனூர் அக்கினீஸ்வரர் கோயில்) is a Hindu temple in the village of Kanjanur, 18 kilometres north-east of Kumbakonam. The presiding deity is Sukra (Venus). However, the main idol in the temple is that of "Agniswarar" or Shiva. In concordance with the Saivite belief that Shiva is all-pervading, Sukra is believed to be located within the stomach of the idol of Shiva.

Architecture
The temple was built by the Medieval Cholas and renovated by the kings of the Vijayanagar Empire. The temple has a 5-tier rajagopuram surrounded by two prakarams (closed precincts of a temple). The temple is revered by the verses of Appar and hence referred as Padal petra stalam. It is one of the shrines of the Vaippu Sthalams sung by Tamil Saivite Nayanar Appar.

Legend
Legend is that Siva blessed Parasara muni (sage) here with cosmic dance. It is believed that Shiva appeared in the form of Sukra to propitiate himself off the dosha of Sukran. The temple is counted as one of the temples built on the northern banks of River Kaveri.

Navagraha
The temple is one of the nine Navagraha temples of Tamil Nadu and is a part of the popular Navagraha pilgrimage in the state - it houses the image of Sukra (Venus).

Notes

References

External links
 
 Muvar Thevara Vaippu Thalangal, மூவர் தேவார வைப்புத்தலங்கள்,  akkIcharam, Sl.No.1 of 139 temples
 Shiva Temples, தேவார வைப்புத்தலங்கள், அக்கீச்சுரம், Sl.No.3 of 133 temples, page1

Shiva temples in Thanjavur district
Navagraha temples in Tamil Nadu
Padal Petra Stalam